Ivan Nathaniel Dixon III (April 6, 1931 – March 16, 2008) was an American actor, director, and producer best known for his series role in the 1960s sitcom Hogan's Heroes, and for his starring roles in the 1964 independent drama Nothing But a Man and the 1967 television film The Final War of Olly Winter. In addition, he directed many episodes of television series.

Active in the civil rights movement from 1961, Dixon served as a president of Negro Actors for Action.

Early life and education
Ivan Nathaniel Dixon III was born in Harlem, Manhattan, New York City, New York, the son of a grocery store owner and his wife, who together later owned a bakery. His parents separated when he was young, and he lived at his mother's apartment while working in his father's grocery store. His father, also named Ivan, fought with distinction in World War I and read Yiddish. When he was young, the family lived in a brownstone at 518 West 150th Street in Harlem, on the same block with Josh White, writer Ralph Ellison, and the tap dancing Hines brothers, Gregory and Maurice.

He graduated from Lincoln Academy, a private black boarding school in Gaston County, North Carolina. He subsequently earned a drama degree in 1954 from North Carolina Central University (NCCU), a historically black college. Its theater troupe is now known as the Ivan Dixon Players in his honor. While at NCCU, he joined the Omega Psi Phi fraternity.

Dixon also later studied drama at Case Western Reserve University, in Cleveland, Ohio, followed by the American Theatre Wing after returning to New York City.

Career
Dixon appeared on stage, and in both movies and TV series or specials. In 1957, Dixon appeared on Broadway in William Saroyan's The Cave Dwellers. In 1959 he performed in Lorraine Hansberry's A Raisin in the Sun.

In 1958, he was a stunt double for Sidney Poitier in the film The Defiant Ones. He was cast in two episodes of The Twilight Zone: "The Big Tall Wish" — as the lead, in a primarily black cast in a TV drama — and a key supporting role in "I Am the Night—Color Me Black". In 1962, Dixon co-starred with Dorothy Dandridge in the "Blues for a Junkman" episode of Cain's Hundred; it was the highest-rated episode of the series. An expanded version was released as a feature film in Europe as The Murder Men; this was Dandridge's last screen appearance.

On September 25, 1962, Dixon portrayed Jamie Davis, a livery stable groom, in the episode "Among the Missing" of NBC's Laramie western series. In 1963, he played the role of John Brooks, alias Caleb Stone IV, in the Perry Mason episode "The Case of the Nebulous Nephew."

In 1964, Dixon starred in the independent film Nothing But a Man, written and directed by Michael Roemer; Dixon said he was most proud of this performance. He also appeared in two episodes of ABC's The Fugitive: "Escape into Black" and "Dossier on a Diplomat".

In his best-known role, Dixon appeared as prisoner of war Staff Sergeant James "Kinch" Kinchloe in the ensemble cast of the television sitcom Hogan's Heroes. "Kinch" was the communications specialist, a translator of German, and Hogan's default second-in-command. Dixon played Kinchloe from 1965 to 1970, the only one of the series' long-time cast who did not stay for the entire series run. Kenneth Washington replaced Dixon for the last year of the show's run, playing a different character who filled a similar role.

Dixon was nominated for an Emmy Award for his performance in the TV movie The Final War of Olly Winter (1967).

Film work and directing
From 1970 to 1993, Dixon worked primarily as a television director on such series and TV movies as  The Waltons, The Rockford Files, The Bionic Woman, The Eddie Capra Mysteries, Magnum, P.I., and The A-Team.

Dixon's first feature film as director was the blaxploitation thriller Trouble Man. He also directed the controversial 1973 feature film The Spook Who Sat by the Door, based on Sam Greenlee's 1969 novel of the same name. It was about the first black CIA agent, who applies his espionage knowledge to lead a black guerrilla operation in Chicago.

The New York Times wrote in 2008:
Although The Spook caused controversy and with suppression facilitated by the F.B.I., was soon pulled from theaters, it later gained cult status as a bootleg video and in 2004 was released on DVD. At that time Mr. Dixon told The Times that the movie had tried only to depict black anger, not to suggest armed revolt as a solution.

Dixon occasionally took acting parts throughout the 1970s and '80s. Notable roles include Lonnie, the straw boss, in 1976's Car Wash (1976). He played a doctor and leader of a guerrilla movement in the ABC miniseries Amerika (1987), set in post-Soviet invasion Nebraska.

In 1978 Dixon served as Chairman of the Expansion Arts Advisory Panel of the National Endowment for the Arts.

After his career as an actor and director, Dixon became owner-operator of radio station KONI (FM) on Maui. In 2001, he left Hawaii for health reasons and sold the radio station in 2002.

Personal life
In 1954, the same year Dixon graduated from North Carolina Central University, he married theater student Berlie Ray. The couple had four children: sons Ivan IV, N'Gai Christopher, and Alan Kimara Dixon; and daughter Doris Nomathande Dixon.

Death
Ivan Dixon died on March 16, 2008, aged 76, at Presbyterian Hospital in Charlotte, North Carolina, of complications from kidney failure. He was predeceased by sons Ivan Dixon IV and N'Gai Christopher Dixon.

His widow Berlie Ray Dixon, born on April 5, 1930, in Badin, North Carolina, died on February 9, 2019, in Charlotte, at age 88.

Filmography

Awards and honors
 National Black Theatre Award
 Paul Robeson Pioneer Award, Black American Cinema Society

References

External links

 

1931 births
2008 deaths
20th-century American male actors
African-American male actors
American male film actors
African-American film directors
African-American television directors
American civil rights activists
Film directors from New York City
American film producers
American male stage actors
American male television actors
American television directors
Deaths from kidney failure
Male actors from New York City
North Carolina Central University alumni
20th-century African-American people
21st-century African-American people